Red jackal may refer to:

 Ethiopian wolf (Canis simensis)
 Black-backed jackal (Lupulella mesomelas), a fox-like animal with a reddish brown to tan coat

Animal common name disambiguation pages